Warlaby is a small village and civil parish in the Hambleton District of North Yorkshire, England. The population of the civil parish taken at the 2011 Census was less than 100. Details are included in the civil parish of Ainderby Steeple. In 2015, North Yorkshire County Council estimated the population to be around 50 people. It is near the A684 and Morton-on-Swale.

The village is mentioned in the Domesday Book as having 75 ploughlands. the name derives from Old English and is believed to be from Wærlaf's By, a personal name.

References

External links

Villages in North Yorkshire
Civil parishes in North Yorkshire